Brachypanorpa sacajawea is a species of scorpionflies, hangingflies, etc. in the family Panorpodidae. It is found in North America.

References

Further reading

 

Mecoptera
Articles created by Qbugbot
Insects described in 1990